USS Scanner (AGR/YAGR-5) was a , converted from a Liberty Ship, acquired by the US Navy in 1955. She was obtained from the National Defense Reserve Fleet and reconfigured as a radar picket ship and assigned to radar picket duty in the North Pacific Ocean as part of the Distant Early Warning Line.

Construction
Scanner (YAGR-5) was laid down on 24 January 1945, under a Maritime Commission (MARCOM) contract, MC hull 2344, as the Liberty Ship Edwin D. Howard, by J.A. Jones Construction, Panama City, Florida. She was launched on 27 February 1945, sponsored by Mrs. John E. Davidson, and delivered on 14 March 1945, to the Alcoa Steamship Company.

Service history
She was acquired by the Navy from the US Maritime Administration (MARAD) on 10 June 1955. She was converted to a radar picket ship at the Norfolk Naval Shipyard, and commissioned Scanner on 30 January 1956.

Scanner departed Norfolk, on 28 March 1956, for her home port, San Francisco, California, and commenced her first patrol in the Pacific Ocean in July 1956, with the seaward extension of America's early warning defense system.

Fitted with sophisticated electronic search and tracking equipment, Scanner could detect, track, and report enemy aircraft at great distances, and control high speed interceptor aircraft in event of attack. She also carried out weather reporting duties during her three to four-week-long cruises.

Decommissioning
Scanner was redesignated AGR-5 effective 28 September 1958. She was decommissioned on 21 July 1965, at San Francisco, and turned over to Maritime Administration (MARAD) custody on 26 July, at Suisun Bay, California. Struck from the Navy List on 1 September 1965, she was transferred permanently to the MARAD on 4 February 1966, and remained in the Suisun Bay reserve fleet until 3 October 1974, when she was sold for non-transport use.

Military awards and honors
Scanners crew was eligible for the following medals:
 National Defense Service Medal

See also 
 United States Navy
 Radar picket

References

Bibliography

External links 
 

 

Liberty ships
Ships built in Panama City, Florida
1945 ships
World War II merchant ships of the United States
Guardian-class radar picket ships
Cold War auxiliary ships of the United States
Suisun Bay Reserve Fleet